Ever since the 2007 municipal reform, Egon Fræhr from Venstre had been mayor of Vejen Municiaplity. He announced in 2020 that he would not stand for re-election. 

Instead Morten Thorøe would be the candidate from Venstre for this election.

Venstre would lose a seat in this election, although still remaining the largest party. However following election night, an utraditional agreement between the Social Democrats
and the Conservatives, would see Frank Schmidt-Hansen from the Conservatives become mayor. 

This would mark the first time since the 2007 municipal reform, that a municipality in the South Jutland constituency would have a mayor from the Conservatives. It was one of three municipalities in the constituency where the Conservatives had mayor's elected in the 2021, and it was seen as a big success for the Conservatives, who had have trouble winning mayor positions outside Greater Copenhagen and  North Zealand in recent elections.

Electoral system
For elections to Danish municipalities, a number varying from 9 to 31 are chosen to be elected to the municipal council. The seats are then allocated using the D'Hondt method and a closed list proportional representation.
Vejen Municipality had 27 seats in 2021

Unlike in Danish General Elections, in elections to municipal councils, electoral alliances are allowed.

Electoral alliances  

Electoral Alliance 1

Electoral Alliance 2

Electoral Alliance 3

Electoral Alliance 4

Results

Notes

References 

Vejen